Priddis may refer to:

Places
Priddis, Alberta, a hamlet in Alberta, Canada
Priddis Greens, a community near Priddis, Alberta, Canada

People with the surname
Anthony Priddis (born 1948), Bishop of Hereford
Luke Priddis (born 1977), Australian professional rugby league footballer 
Matt Priddis (born 1985), Australian rules footballer 
Roshani Priddis (born 1987), contestant on Australian Idol